Rokado was a German professional cycling team that existed from 1972 to 1975. A notable result was the points classification of the  1973 Tour de France with Herman Van Springel.

References

Cycling teams based in Germany
Defunct cycling teams based in Germany
1972 establishments in Germany
1975 disestablishments in Germany
Cycling teams established in 1972
Cycling teams disestablished in 1975